The 2016 TVB Star Awards Malaysia, presented by TVB Entertainment News, Astro, MY FM, and MELODY FM in Malaysia, is an awards ceremony that recognises the best Hong Kong TVB television programmes that aired on Malaysia's Astro On Demand and Astro Wah Lai Toi in 2016. It was held on 26 November 2016 at Arena of Stars in Genting Highlands, Pahang, Malaysia, and was broadcast live through Malaysia's Astro Wah Lai Toi (Astro Channel 310 (HD) & 311), Hong Kong's TVB Jade (Astro Channel 326 & Hong Kong Digital Terrestrial Channel 81) and TVB Entertainment News. The ceremony was hosted by Carol Cheng, FAMA, Jarvis Chow and Ashley Chu.

The awards ceremony was officially announced on 7 October 2016, and presented 13 nomination categories. Nominees were announced on 13 October through their official website and a mobile app for Android and iOS. The Malaysian public are able to vote for their favourite stars by casting votes on the platforms. Voting period lasted from 13 October to 19 November 2016.

A Fist Within Four Walls was the night's biggest winner with eleven trophies, including Favourite TVB Drama Series, Favourite TVB Actor, and Favourite TVB Actress.

Winners and nominees

Programs

Acting and hosting

References

External links
Official Instagram

TVB original programming
2016 television awards
2016 in Hong Kong television
Genting Highlands